In geometry, a compound of four tetrahedra can be constructed by four tetrahedra in a number of different symmetry positions.

Uniform compounds 
It has dihedral symmetry, D8h,  and the same vertex arrangement as the convex octagonal prism.  

This compound can also be seen as two compounds of stella octangulae fit evenly on the same C2 plane of symmetry, with one pair of tetrahedra shifted . It is a special case of a p/q-gonal prismatic compound of antiprisms, where in this case the component p/q = 2 is a digonal antiprism, or tetrahedron. 

Below are two perspective viewpoints of the uniform compound of four tetrahedra, with each color representing one regular tetrahedron:

Four tetrahedra that are not spread equally in  angles over C2 can still hold uniform symmetry when allowed rotational freedom. In this case, these tetrahedra share a symmetric arrangement over the common axis of symmetry C2 that is rotated by equal and opposite angles. This compound is indexed as UC22, with parameters p/q = 2 and n = 4 as well.

Other compounds 

A nonuniform compound can be generated by rotating tetrahedra about lines extending from the center of each face and through the centroid (as altitudes), with varying degrees of rotation. 

A model for this compound polyhedron was first published by Robert Webb, using his program Stella, in 2004, following studies of polyhedron models:

With edge-length as a unit, it has a surface area equal to
 
.

This compound is self-dual, meaning its dual polyhedron is the same compound polyhedron.

References 

 (Figure 6.a "Compounds")

See also 
Compound of three tetrahedra
Compound of five tetrahedra
Compound of six tetrahedra

External links 
Tetrahedron 4-Compound (nonuniform) with adjustable angles at GeoGebra

Polyhedral compounds